Dirty Tricks is a 1981 American comedy film directed by Alvin Rakoff and written by William W. Norton, Eleanor E. Norton, Thomas Gifford and Camille Gifford. The film stars Elliott Gould, Kate Jackson, Rich Little, Arthur Hill, John Juliani and Alberta Watson.

Plot

A Harvard University student, (Nicholas Campbell) attempts to contact Prof. Chandler, (Elliott Gould) to authenticate a mysterious letter supposedly signed by George Washington. The student is murdered and the letter vanishes. Professor Chandler finds himself being hunted by a mafia killer and intrepid TV reporter Karen Polly Bishop (Kate Jackson).

Cast

Elliott Gould as Professor Chandler
Kate Jackson as Karen Polly Bishop
Rich Little as Robert Brennan
Arthur Hill as Professor Prosser
John Juliani as Roselli
Alberta Watson as Tony
Mavor Moore as Mr. Underhill
Nicholas Campbell as Bill Darcy
Michael McNamara as Thorn
Martin McNamara as Ozzie
Cindy Girling as Emily
Michael Kirby as FBI Agent Wicklow
Angus MacInnes as FBI Agent Jones 
Hugh Webster as Mr. Darcy
Irene Kessler as Mrs. Cohen
Earl Pennington as Taxi driver
Joyce Campion as Mrs. Greenshields 
Ken Umland as Cameraman
Neil Affleck as Student #1
Murray Cruchley as Anchorman 
George E. Zeeman as Fire Captain
Lily Godfrey as Nurse
Michael Harrouch as Patient
Robert D. Koby as Doctor 
Anthony Sherwood as Soundman
Lewis Pugh as Elderly Man
Griffith Brewer as The Veteran 
Jeannette Tucker as Secretary
Isabelle Hunting as Elderly Lady
Lisa Bodie as Nurse 
Kate Trotter as Sally

Production
Principal photography began on August 13, 1979 in Montreal and lasted about nine weeks; additional location shooting was done in Boston where the film was set. The film was made with the participation of the Canadian Film Development Corporation.

Release
Distributed by AVCO Embassy Pictures, the film began an initial test run in Chicago on March 20, 1981, followed by a wider release on May 1 of that year.

Home media
The film was released on VHS in the United States by Embassy Home Entertainment.

Reception
Larry Kart of the Chicago Tribune gave the film zero stars out of four and wrote that "the shoddiness of the product is beyond belief. Lines are blown left and right, cuts within scenes don't match, and the performances would be unacceptable in a home movie ... If you've ever wondered what it's like at the bottom of the barrel, this film will take you on a guided tour." Variety wrote, "Despite the efforts of a willing and able cast, 'Dirty Tricks' flounders as a would-be chase comedy, done in by lame writing and misjudged direction." Kevin Thomas of the Los Angeles Times stated, "Elliott Gould is such fun and so full of sweet mischief in 'Dirty Tricks' (selected theaters) it's a shame that it wastes both him and an amusing premise ... There are lot of car chases ending in routinely spectacular crashes, lots of trite spoofing of the Mafia and the FBI and lots of bloody violence, all of which is scarcely amusing." Gary Arnold of The Washington Post called the film "so shabby that it almost makes 'Foul Play' look classy." David Macfarlane of Maclean's wrote, "Dirty Tricks is crass, witless and boring. Its humor is invariably sexist, its violence gratuitous. The acting is abysmal, the screenplay atrocious, and the direction beyond the pale. Any film that is little more than a vehicle for Gould's just-got-out-of-bed-where's-the-coffee style is obviously in very big trouble."

References

External links
 

1981 films
Films set in Boston
American comedy films
1981 comedy films
Films directed by Alvin Rakoff
Embassy Pictures films
1980s English-language films
1980s American films